Steven R. Appleton (March 31, 1960 – February 3, 2012) was the CEO of Micron Technology, based in Boise, Idaho.

Born and raised in California, Appleton attended Boise State University, where he was on the tennis team. A lifelong aviation enthusiast, he died when his single-engine plane crashed shortly after takeoff in Boise, Idaho, on February 3, 2012.

Career
Appleton started his career at Micron shortly after graduation in 1983, working the night shift in production. He held a variety of positions in the company, including Wafer Fab manager, production manager, director of manufacturing, and vice president of manufacturing before being appointed president and COO in 1991. He was appointed to the position of CEO and chairman of the board in 1994 at age 34. In January 1996, he was fired and then rehired 8 days later.

He formerly served on the board of directors for SEMATECH, the Idaho State Supreme Court Advisory Council, and was appointed by the Clinton Administration to serve on the National Semiconductor Technology Council. At the time of his death, he was serving on the board of directors for the Semiconductor Industry Association, and the board of directors for National Semiconductor Corporation, The U.S. Technology CEO Council, and was a member of the World Semiconductor Council and the Idaho Business Council. After his death, Mark Durcan assumed Appleton's position as CEO of Micron.

In 2011 he received the Robert Noyce Award from the Semiconductor Industry Association.

Personal life
Appleton participated in a number of sports, including professional tennis. His hobbies included scuba diving, surfing, wakeboarding, motorcycling, and more recently, off-road car racing. His aviation background included multiple ratings and professional performances at air shows in both propeller and jet-powered aircraft. He also had a black belt in taekwondo.

On the 43rd edition of the Tecate SCORE Baja 1000 on 2010, Appleton finished 1st on a SCORE Class 1 buggy and 7th overall with a time of 20:32.18.

He was married to his wife Dalynn, and had 4 children.

Death
On February 3, 2012, Appleton was killed while attempting an emergency landing in a Lancair IV-PT experimental-category, four-seat, turboprop airplane at the Boise Airport, moments after taking off. He had aborted a take off a few minutes earlier for unknown reasons.

Eight years earlier in 2004 with a passenger aboard and several miles south of the same airport, Appleton had a serious plane crash piloting an Extra 300; he sustained a punctured lung, head injuries, ruptured disk, and broken bones. The passenger was a Micron employee and was also injured; he was photographing Appleton for an upcoming corporate presentation.

References

External links 
 2006 Q&A with USA Today about tennis and leadership

1960 births
2012 deaths
Accidental deaths in Idaho
American computer businesspeople
American technology chief executives
Aviators killed in aviation accidents or incidents in the United States
Boise State Broncos men's tennis players
Businesspeople from California
People from Boise, Idaho
Victims of aviation accidents or incidents in 2012
20th-century American businesspeople